"Mother Is Gone" is a song by Hank Williams.  It had appeared in Williams' song folio in 1946 and was released as a posthumous single by MGM Records in 1955.  The narrator in the song laments the passing of his mother, one of several compositions that Williams wrote containing a maternal theme that was likely influenced by Roy Acuff and other singers who recorded similar songs.  The original recording was a demo Williams made for publishing company Acuff-Rose sometime between 1946 and 1949.

References

Hank Williams songs
1955 singles